The 2021–22 Tampa Bay Lightning season was the 30th season for the National Hockey League (NHL) franchise that was established on December 16, 1991. The Lightning entered the season as the two-time defending Stanley Cup champions.

The Lightning rejoined the Atlantic Division after a one-season stint in the Central Division due to re-alignment under league's return to play protocols. On April 14, 2022, the Lightning clinched a playoff berth after a 4–3 overtime win against the Anaheim Ducks. On June 11, 2022, the Lightning clinched their third straight Stanley Cup Finals berth after a 2–1 win against the New York Rangers in Game 6 of the Eastern Conference Finals. However they came up short for a third consecutive Stanley Cup title, to the Colorado Avalanche in Game 6, on June 26.

Off-season

July
The Lightning's off-season began after becoming back to back champions with the winning of its third Stanley Cup in franchise history in a 4–1 series win over the Montreal Canadiens. The win also made the Lightning only the ninth franchise in NHL history to win a back to back championship.

On July 17, 2021, the Lightning announced the re-signing of defenseman Fredrik Claesson to a one-year, two-way contract. Claesson appeared in two regular season games with the Lightning after coming over via trade from the San Jose Sharks. 

That same day, the Lightning traded the negotiating rights to forward Barclay Goodrow to the New York Rangers in exchange for a 7th-round pick in the 2022 NHL Entry Draft. Goodrow was a member of the Lightning's back to back championships.

On July 18, 2021, the NHL released the full list of players protected in the 2021 NHL Expansion Draft. The Lightning opted to protect Erik Cernak, Anthony Cirelli, Victor Hedman, Nikita Kucherov, Ryan McDonagh, Brayden Point, Mikhail Sergachev and Andrei Vasilevskiy. This left Blake Coleman, Ross Colton, Cal Foote, Yanni Gourde, Tyler Johnson, Mathieu Joseph, Patrick Maroon, Curtis McElhinney, Ondrej Palat, Jan Rutta, Luke Schenn and Mitchell Stephens from their back to back championship rosters exposed for the Seattle Kraken to select.

On July 19, 2021, the Lightning announced that it had signed a 2-year extension with the Orlando Solar Bears to keep it as its ECHL affiliate.

On July 21, 2021, the Seattle Kraken selected forward Yanni Gourde during their expansion draft from the Lightning. Gourde spent the past six seasons with the team. He skated in 310 games, recording 80 goals, 107 assists and winner of 2 Stanley Cups.

On July 24, 2021, the Lightning announced that it had re-signed forward Gemel Smith to a 2-year contract extension. Smith appeared in five games with the Lightning during the regular season, recording three assists. 
 
On July 24 and 25, 2021, the Lightning made seven selections in the 2021. The Lightning picked 4 forwards and 3 defensemen. The following players made up their picks: Roman Schmidt (D), Dylan Duke (LW), Cameron MacDonald (C), Alex Gagne (D), Daniil Pylenkov (D), Robert Flinton (LW) and Niko Huuhtanen (RW).

On July 26, 2021, the Lightning announced that it had issued qualify offers to restricted free agents Alex Barre-Boulet, Ross Colton, Boris Katchouk, Taylor Raddysh, Otto Somppi, Sean Day and Cal Foote. Former draft picks Ryan Lohin and Dominik Masin were not issued qualifying offers, which resulted in them becoming unrestricted free agents.

On July 27, 2021, the Lightning announced that it had re-signed Otto Somppi to a one-year contract extension. Somppi appeared in 32 games with the Syracuse Crunch last season, recording 12 goals and 26 points.

Later that evening, the Lightning reached an agreement with the Chicago Blackhawks to trade Tyler Johnson and a 2nd-round pick in the 2023 NHL Entry Draft in exchange for defensemen Brent Seabrook. Johnson spent the past 9-seasons with the Lightning. This past season he scored 8 goals and 14 assists in 55 regular season games. Johnson also scored 4 goals and 3 assists in playoffs during the Lightning's playoff run to the team's 3rd championship.  The Lightning will be using Seabrook's cap hit to stay cap compliant by placing him on long term injured reserve (LTIR) at the start of the season.

On July 28, 2021, the Lightning began the first day of free agency by announcing the signing of free agents Gabriel Dumont, Charles Hudon, Darren Raddysh, Andrej Sustr and Maxime Legace to one-year contracts. Dumont and Sustr had both previously played for the team. Darren Raddysh is the brother of Lightning prospect Taylor Raddysh.

The next free agent signing announced by the Lightning was that of goaltender Brian Elliott. The team signed Elliott to a one-year contract valued at $900k. Elliott spent the previous three seasons with the Philadelphia Flyers. Elliott was signed as the replacement of Curtis McElhinney as the team's backup goaltender.

The next signing was 2020 Stanley Cup champion Zach Bogosian. Bogosian left the team as a free agent after helping the team to its second Stanley Cup by signing a one-year deal with the Toronto Maple Leafs. Bogosian signed a three-year contract that carries an annual cap hit of $850,000.

The team next announced that it had signed Brayden Point to an 8-year contract extension valued at $75 million. The Lightning draft pick has skated in 351 career NHL games with the team, recording 139 goals and 310 points. Point was also a member of the Lightning's back to back championships.

The Lightning moved back to free agent signings with the signing of Pierre-Edouard Bellemare to a two-year contract. The Bellemare contract will carry a cap hit of $1 million. Bellemare spent the past two seasons with the Colorado Avalanche. He recorded 18 goals and 15 assists during that timeframe.

The Lightning finished the day with the signing of free agent Remi Elie to a one-year contract. Elie has appeared in 106 career NHL games between the Dallas Stars and Buffalo Sabres. He spent the past season playing for the Rochester Americans of the American Hockey League.

On July 29, 2021, the Lightning announced the signing of forward Corey Perry to a two-year contract valued at $2 million. Perry joins the team after having lost to the team in consecutive finals with the Dallas Stars and Montreal Canadiens. Perry has been in the league for 16 years, recording 386 goals and 818 points over that span.

The same day the team announced that it had re-signed defenseman Cal Foote to a two-year contract extension. The contract is to carry a cap hit of $850k. Foote was drafted by the team in 2017, and has skated in 35 career NHL games. 

On July 30, 2021, the Lightning announced the re-signing of forward Alex Barre-Boulet to a three-year contract extension. The contract will carry an annual cap hit of $758k. Barre-Boulet appeared in 15 games last season after making his NHL debut with the team.

That day the Lightning also announced that it had traded forward Mitchell Stephens to the Detroit Red Wings in exchange for 6th-round pick in the 2022 NHL Entry Draft. Stephens had played in 45 games with the Lightning over the past two seasons. Stephens had three goals and four assists in the Lightning's 2020 championship run.

Only July 31, 2021, the Lightning announced that it had re-signed forwards Taylor Raddysh and Boris Katchouk to three-year contract extensions. Both contracts will carry an annual cap hit of $758k. Raddysh has skated in 159 career AHL games, recording 49 goals and 110 points. Katchuouk has skated in 164 career AHL games, recording 36 goals and 89 points. Both forwards are expected to compete for the open roster spots at forward.

Later that day the team announced that it had traded goaltender Spencer Martin to the Vancouver Canucks for future considerations. Martin recorded a 7-5-2 recorded in 15 games last season with the Syracuse Crunch of the American Hockey League.

August

On August 1, 2021, the Lightning announced the re-signing of defenseman Sean Day to a one-year contract extension. Day appeared in 29 games with the Syracuse Crunch last season, recording 3 goals and 15 assists over 29 games.

On August 9, 2021, the Lightning announced the re-signing of Ross Colton to a two-year contract extension. The contract will carry an annual cap hit of $1.125 million. Colton made his NHL debut this past season, skating scoring 9 goals and 3 assists over 30-games. Colton was also just the seventh rookie in NHL history to score a Stanley Cup winning goal and the second in the NHL's modern era.

Training camp

September
On September 21, 2021, the Lightning announced their 60-man 2021 training camp roster. The initial roster consists of 36 forwards, 18 defensemen and 6 goaltenders. Amongst the contracted players are 6 invitees that are not under contract with the Lightning.   

On September 28, 2021, the Lightning signed General Manager Julien BriseBois to a contract extension. BriseBois was the General Manager of the team during their back to back cup wins and has been with the franchise since 2010.    

On September 29, 2021, the Lightning announced their first round of training camp roster cuts. Forwards Jack Finley, Niko Huuhtanen, Cameron MacDonald and Declan McDonnell were reassigned to their junior clubs. Defenseman Roman Schmidt was also reassigned to his junior club. The Lightning also released Xavier Cormier and Avery Winslow from their camp tryouts.

October
On October 4, 2021, the Lightning announced its second round of training camp roster cuts. The team cut 13 forwards, 6 defensemen and 3 goaltenders. This reduced the roster to 18 forwards, 11 defensemen and 3 goaltenders.    

Later in the day the team announced that it had cut four more players from its training camp roster. Gabriel Dumont, Charles Hudon, Sean Day and Darren Raddysh were assigned to the Syracuse Crunch to prepare for the start of the AHL season. This further trimmed the roster down to 16 forwards, 9 defensemen and 3 goaltenders. 

On October 8, 2021, the Lightning announced the reduction of the training camp roster by two players. Simon Ryfors was assigned to the Syracuse Crunch of the AHL, and Amir Miftakhov was assigned to the Orlando Solar Bears of the ECHL. This brought the team's roster down to 15 forwards, 9 defensemen and 2 goaltenders. 

On October 10, 2021, the Lightning placed Alex Barre-Boulet, Fredrik Claesson and Andrej Šustr on waivers for the purpose of assigning them to the Syracuse Crunch.

On October 11, 2021, the Lightning announced the re-signing of head coach Jon Cooper to a 3-year contract extension. The contract terms were not released, however, they are believed to be in the same ballpark as Joel Quenneville ($5.5 million per year). 

Later that afternoon the Seattle Kraken claimed Alex Barre-Boulet off of waivers from the Lightning. Barre-Boulet skated in 15 games with the team last season.

The Lightning announced its opening night roster shortly after the waiver claim news broke. The forward group consisted of Pierre-Edouard Bellemare, Anthony Cirelli, Ross Colton, Mathieu Joseph, Boris Katchouk, Alex Killorn, Nikita Kucherov, Patrick Maroon, Ondrej Palat, Corey Perry, Brayden Point, Taylor Raddysh, Gemel Smith and Steven Stamkos. The defensemen group consisted of Zach Bogosian, Erik Cernak, Cal Foote, Victor Hedman, Ryan McDonagh, Jan Rutta and Mikhail Sergachev. The roster was rounded out with goaltenders Andrei Vasilevskiy and Brian Elliott.

Standings

Divisional standings

Conference standings

Schedule and results

Preseason

|- align="center" bgcolor="ffcccc"
| 1 || September 28 || @ Carolina Hurricanes || 1–3 ||  || Lagacé || PNC Arena || 12,370 || 0–1–0 || 
|- align="center" bgcolor="ffcccc"
| 2 || September 30 || Nashville Predators || 2–6 ||  || Elliott || Amalie Arena || 11,054 || 0–2–0 || 
|- align="center" bgcolor="ccffcc"
| 3 || October 1 || Carolina Hurricanes || 8–5 ||  || Alnefelt || Amalie Arena || 12,509 || 1–2–0 || 
|- align="center" bgcolor="ffcccc"
| 4 || October 2 || @ Nashville Predators || 1–6 ||  || Elliott || Bridgestone Arena || 14,884 || 1–3–0 || 
|- align="center" bgcolor="ffcccc"
| 5 || October 5 || vs. Florida Panthers || 2–3 ||  || Vasilevskiy || Amway Center ||  || 1–4–0 || 
|- align="center" bgcolor="ccffcc"
| 6 || October 7 || Florida Panthers || 6–2 ||  || Elliott || Amalie Arena || 11,853 || 2–4–0 || 
|- align="center" bgcolor="ccffcc"
| 7 || October 9 || @ Florida Panthers || 4–2 ||  || Vasilevskiy || FLA Live Arena || 12,221 || 3–4–0 || 
|-

|-
| Lightning score listed first;

Regular season
The regular season schedule was released on July 22, 2021. Initially the Lightning were scheduled for only three games in February because NHL players were planning to participate in the 2022 Winter Olympics. The 2022 NHL All-Star Game was also scheduled to be held in February prior to the Olympics. On December 22, it was announced that NHL players would not play in the Olympics due to COVID-19 concerns, as well as the number of regular season games postponed throughout the league due to COVID-19. Having pulled out of the Olympics, the league plans to reschedule postponed games for dates in February, while the two-day all-star event is still planned to be held.

|- align="center" bgcolor="ffcccc"
| 1 || October 12 || Pittsburgh Penguins || 2–6 ||  || Vasilevskiy || Amalie Arena || 19,092 || 0–1–0 || 0 || 
|- align="center" bgcolor="ccffcc"
| 2 || October 14 || @ Detroit Red Wings || 7–6 || OT || Vasilevskiy || Little Caesars Arena || 19,515 || 1–1–0 || 2 || 
|- align="center" bgcolor="ccffcc"
| 3 || October 16 || @ Washington Capitals || 2–1 || OT || Vasilevskiy || Capital One Arena || 18,573 || 2–1–0 || 4 || 
|- align="center" bgcolor="ffcccc"
| 4 || October 19 || Florida Panthers || 1–4 ||  || Vasilevskiy || Amalie Arena || 19,092 || 2–2–0 || 4 || 
|- align="center" bgcolor="b0c4dE"
| 5 || October 23 || Colorado Avalanche || 3–4 || SO || Vasilevskiy || Amalie Arena || 19,092 || 2–2–1 || 5 || 
|- align="center" bgcolor="ffcccc"
| 6 || October 25 || @ Buffalo Sabres || 1–5 ||  || Elliott || KeyBank Center || 7,417 || 2–3–1 || 5 || 
|- align="center" bgcolor="ccffcc"
| 7 || October 26 || @ Pittsburgh Penguins || 5–1 ||  || Vasilevskiy || PPG Paints Arena || 15,732 || 3–3–1 || 7 || 
|- align="center" bgcolor="ccffcc"
| 8 || October 28 || Arizona Coyotes || 5–1 ||  || Vasilevskiy || Amalie Arena || 19,092 || 4–3–1 || 9 || 

|- align="center" bgcolor="ccffcc"
| 9 || November 1 || Washington Capitals || 3–2 ||  || Vasilevskiy || Amalie Arena || 19,092 || 5–3–1 || 11 || 
|- align="center" bgcolor="B0C4DE"
| 10 || November 4 || @ Toronto Maple Leafs || 1–2 || OT || Vasilevskiy || Scotiabank Arena || 18,937 || 5–3–2 || 12 || 
|- align="center" bgcolor="ccffcc"
| 11 || November 6 || @ Ottawa Senators || 5–3 ||  || Elliott || Canadian Tire Centre || 12,417 || 6–3–2 || 14 || 
|- align="center" bgcolor="B0C4DE"
| 12 || November 9 || Carolina Hurricanes || 1–2 || OT || Vasilevskiy || Amalie Arena || 19,092 || 6–3–3 || 15 || 
|- align="center" bgcolor="ccffcc"
| 13 || November 13 || Florida Panthers || 3–2 || OT || Vasilevskiy || Amalie Arena || 19,092 || 7–3–3 || 17 || 
|- align="center" bgcolor="ccffcc"
| 14 || November 15 || New York Islanders || 4–1 ||  || Vasilevskiy || Amalie Arena || 19,092 || 8–3–3 || 19 || 
|- align="center" bgcolor="ccffcc"
| 15 || November 18 || @ Philadelphia Flyers || 4–3 || SO || Vasilevskiy || Wells Fargo Center || 18,243 || 9–3–3 || 21 || 
|- align="center" bgcolor="ffcccc"
| 16 || November 20 || New Jersey Devils || 3–5 ||  || Vasilevskiy || Amalie Arena || 19,092 || 9–4–3 || 21 || 
|- align="center" bgcolor="ccffcc"
| 17 || November 21 || Minnesota Wild || 5–4 || SO || Elliott || Amalie Arena || 19,092 || 10–4–3 || 23 || 
|- align="center" bgcolor="ccffcc"
| 18 || November 23 || Philadelphia Flyers || 4–0 ||  || Vasilevskiy || Amalie Arena || 19,092 || 11–4–3 || 25 || 
|- align="center" bgcolor="ccffcc"
| 19 || November 26 || Seattle Kraken || 3–0 ||  || Vasilevskiy || Amalie Arena || 19,092 || 12–4–3 || 27 || 
|- align="center" bgcolor="ffcccc"
| 20 || November 28 || @ Minnesota Wild || 2–4 ||  || Vasilevskiy || Xcel Energy Center || 17,785 || 12–5–3 || 27 || 
|- align="center" bgcolor="B0C4DE"
| 21 || November 30 || @ St. Louis Blues || 3–4 || SO || Elliott || Enterprise Center || 16,605 || 12–5–4 || 28 || 

|- align="center" bgcolor="ccffcc"
| 22 || December 2 || St. Louis Blues || 4–2 ||  || Vasilevskiy || Amalie Arena || 19,092 || 13–5–4 || 30 || 
|- align="center" bgcolor="ccffcc"
| 23 || December 4 || @ Boston Bruins || 3–2 || OT || Vasilevskiy || TD Garden || 17,850 || 14–5–4 || 32 || 
|- align="center" bgcolor="ccffcc"
| 24 || December 5 || @ Philadelphia Flyers || 7–1 ||  || Elliott || Wells Fargo Center || 16,014 || 15–5–4 || 34 || 
|- align="center" bgcolor="ccffcc"
| 25 || December 7 || @ Montreal Canadiens || 3–2 ||  || Vasilevskiy || Bell Centre || 19,976 || 16–5–4 || 36 || 
|- align="center" bgcolor="ccffcc"
| 26 || December 9 || @ Toronto Maple Leafs || 5–3 ||  || Vasilevskiy || Scotiabank Arena || 18,919 || 17–5–4 || 38 || 
|- align="center" bgcolor="ffcccc"
| 27 || December 11 || @ Ottawa Senators || 0–4 ||  || Elliott || Canadian Tire Centre || 13,076 || 17–6–4 || 38 || 
|- align="center" bgcolor="ccffcc"
| 28 || December 14 || Los Angeles Kings || 3–2 || OT || Vasilevskiy || Amalie Arena || 19,092 || 18–6–4 || 40 || 
|- align="center" bgcolor="ccffcc"
| 29 || December 16 || Ottawa Senators || 2–1 ||  || Vasilevskiy || Amalie Arena || 19,092 || 19–6–4 || 42 || 
|- align="center" bgcolor="cccccc"
| — || December 18 || @ Colorado Avalanche || colspan=8|Postponed due to multiple Colorado Avalanche players in COVID-19 protocols. Makeup date: February 10.
|- align="center" bgcolor="ccffcc"
| 30 || December 21 || @ Vegas Golden Knights || 4–3 ||  || Vasilevskiy || T-Mobile Arena || 18,217 || 20–6–4 || 44 || 
|- align="center" bgcolor="cccccc"
| — || December 23 || @ Arizona Coyotes || colspan=8|Postponed after agreement to begin holiday break earlier following other COVID-19 related postponements. Makeup date: February 11.
|- align="center" bgcolor="ccffcc"
| 31 || December 28 || Montreal Canadiens || 5–4 || OT || Lagace || Amalie Arena || 19,092 || 21–6–4 || 46 || 
|- align="center" bgcolor="ffcccc"
| 32 || December 30 || @ Florida Panthers || 3–9 ||  || Lagace || FLA Live Arena || 15,001 || 21–7–4 || 46 || 
|- align="center" bgcolor="B0C4DE"
| 33 || December 31 || New York Rangers || 3–4 || SO || Elliott  || Amalie Arena || 19,092 || 21–7–5 || 47 || 

|- align="center" bgcolor="ffcccc"
| 34 || January 2 || @ New York Rangers || 0–4 ||  || Vasilevskiy || Madison Square Garden || 16,885 || 21–8–5 || 47 || 
|- align="center" bgcolor="ccffcc"
| 35 || January 4 || @ Columbus Blue Jackets || 7–2 ||  || Vasilevskiy || Nationwide Arena || 14,816 || 22–8–5 || 49 || 
|- align="center" bgcolor="ccffcc"
| 36 || January 6 || Calgary Flames || 4–1 ||  || Vasilevskiy || Amalie Arena || 19,092 || 23–8–5 || 51 || 
|- align="center" bgcolor="ffcccc"
| 37 || January 8 || Boston Bruins || 2–5 ||  || Vasilevskiy || Amalie Arena || 19,092 || 23–9–5 || 51 || 
|- align="center" bgcolor="cccccc"
| — || January 10 || @ New Jersey Devils || colspan=8|Postponed due to multiple New Jersey Devils players in COVID-19 protocols. Makeup date: February 15.
|- align="center" bgcolor="ccffcc"
| 38 || January 11 || @ Buffalo Sabres || 6–1 ||  || Vasilevskiy || KeyBank Center || 8,368 || 24–9–5 || 53 || 
|- align="center" bgcolor="ccffcc"
| 39 || January 13 || Vancouver Canucks || 4–2 ||  || Vasilevskiy || Amalie Arena || 19,092 || 25–9–5 || 55 || 
|- align="center" bgcolor="ccffcc"
| 40 || January 15 || Dallas Stars || 3–1 ||  || Vasilevskiy || Amalie Arena || 19,092 || 26–9–5 || 57 || 
|- align="center" bgcolor="ccffcc"
| 41 || January 18 || @ Los Angeles Kings || 6–4 ||  || Vasilevskiy || Crypto.com Arena || 15,128 || 27–9–5 || 59 || 
|- align="center" bgcolor="ffcccc"
| 42 || January 21 || @ Anaheim Ducks || 1–5 ||  || Vasilevskiy || Honda Center || 13,148 || 27–10–5 || 59 || 
|- align="center" bgcolor="ccffcc"
| 43 || January 22 || @ San Jose Sharks || 7–1 ||  || Elliott || SAP Center || 14,193 || 28–10–5 || 61 || 
|- align="center" bgcolor="ccffcc"
| 44 || January 27 || New Jersey Devils || 3–2 ||  || Vasilevskiy || Amalie Arena || 19,092 || 29–10–5 || 63 || 
|- align="center" bgcolor="B0C4DE"
| 45 || January 29 || Vegas Golden Knights || 2–3 || SO || Vasilevskiy || Amalie Arena || 19,092 || 29–10–6 || 64 || 

|- align="center" bgcolor="ccffcc"
| 46 || February 1 || San Jose Sharks || 3–2 || OT || Vasilevskiy || Amalie Arena || 19,092 || 30–10–6 || 66 || 
|- align="center" bgcolor="#bbbbbb"
| colspan=11 |All-star break (February 4–5)
|- align="center" bgcolor="ffcccc"
| 47 || February 10 || @ Colorado Avalanche || 2–3 ||  || Vasilevskiy || Ball Arena || 18,018 || 30–11–6 || 66 || 
|- align="center" bgcolor="ccffcc"
| 48 || February 11 || @ Arizona Coyotes || 4–3 ||  || Elliott || Gila River Arena || 11,727 || 31–11–6 || 68 || 
|- align="center" bgcolor="ccffcc"
| 49 || February 15 || @ New Jersey Devils || 6–3 ||  || Vasilevskiy || Prudential Center || 10,410 || 32–11–6 || 70 || 
|- align="center" bgcolor="ccffcc"
| 50 || February 23 || Edmonton Oilers || 5–3 ||  || Vasilevskiy || Amalie Arena || 19,092 || 33–11–6 || 72 || 
|- align="center" bgcolor="ccffcc"
| 51 || February 26 || @ Nashville Predators || 3–2 ||  || Vasilevskiy || Nissan Stadium || 68,619(outdoors) || 34–11–6 || 74 || 

|- align="center" bgcolor="ccffcc"
| 52 || March 1 || Ottawa Senators || 5–2 ||  || Vasilevskiy || Amalie Arena || 19,092 || 35–11–6 || 76 || 
|- align="center" bgcolor="ffcccc"
| 53 || March 3 || Pittsburgh Penguins || 1–5 ||  || Vasilevskiy || Amalie Arena || 19,092 || 35–12–6 || 76 || 
|- align="center" bgcolor="ccffcc"
| 54 || March 4 || Detroit Red Wings || 3–1 ||  || Elliott || Amalie Arena || 19,092 || 36–12–6 || 78 || 
|- align="center" bgcolor="ccffcc"
| 55 || March 6 || @ Chicago Blackhawks || 6–3 ||  || Vasilevskiy || United Center || 18,856 || 37–12–6 || 80 || 
|- align="center" bgcolor="ffcccc"
| 56 || March 8 || @ Winnipeg Jets || 4–7 ||  || Vasilevskiy || Canada Life Centre || 12,925 || 37–13–6 || 80 || 
|- align="center" bgcolor="ffcccc"
| 57 || March 10 || @ Calgary Flames || 1–4 ||  || Vasilevskiy || Scotiabank Saddledome || 15,689 || 37–14–6 || 80 || 
|- align="center" bgcolor="ffcccc"
| 58 || March 12 || @ Edmonton Oilers || 1–4 ||  || Elliott || Rogers Place || 17,528 || 37–15–6 || 80 || 
|- align="center" bgcolor="ccffcc"
| 59 || March 13 || @ Vancouver Canucks || 2–1 ||  || Vasilevskiy || Rogers Arena || 18,760 || 38–15–6 || 82 || 
|- align="center" bgcolor="ccffcc"
| 60 || March 16 || @ Seattle Kraken || 4–1 ||  || Vasilevskiy || Climate Pledge Arena || 17,151 || 39–15–6 || 84 || 
|- align="center" bgcolor="ffcccc"
| 61 || March 19 || New York Rangers || 1–2 ||  || Vasilevskiy || Amalie Arena || 19,092 || 39–16–6 || 84 || 
|- align="center" bgcolor="ffcccc"
| 62 || March 22 || @ Carolina Hurricanes || 2–3 ||  || Vasilevskiy || PNC Arena || 16,783 || 39–17–6 || 84 || 
|- align="center" bgcolor="ffcccc"
| 63 || March 24 || @ Boston Bruins || 2–3 ||  || Vasilevskiy || TD Garden || 17,850 || 39–18–6 || 84 || 
|- align="center" bgcolor="ccffcc"
| 64 || March 26 || @ Detroit Red Wings || 2–1 || OT || Elliott || Little Caesars Arena || 19,515 || 40–18–6 || 86 || 
|- align="center" bgcolor="ccffcc"
| 65 || March 27 || @ New York Islanders || 4–1 ||  || Vasilevskiy || UBS Arena || 17,255 || 41–18–6 || 88 || 
|- align="center" bgcolor="ccffcc"
| 66 || March 29 || Carolina Hurricanes || 4–3 || OT || Vasilevskiy || Amalie Arena || 19,092 || 42–18–6 || 90 || 

|- align="center" bgcolor="ccffcc"
| 67 || April 1 || Chicago Blackhawks || 5–2 ||  || Vasilevskiy || Amalie Arena || 19,092 || 43–18–6 || 92 || 
|- align="center" bgcolor="B0C4DE"
| 68 || April 2 || Montreal Canadiens || 4–5 || SO || Elliott || Amalie Arena || 19,092 || 43–18–7 || 93 || 
|- align="center" bgcolor="ffcccc"
| 69 || April 4 || Toronto Maple Leafs || 2–6 ||  || Vasilevskiy || Amalie Arena || 19,092 || 43–19–7 || 93 || 
|- align="center" bgcolor="ffcccc"
| 70 || April 6 || @ Washington Capitals || 3–4 ||  || Vasilevskiy || Capital One Arena || 18,573 || 43–20–7 || 93 || 
|- align="center" bgcolor="B0C4DE"
| 71 || April 8 || Boston Bruins || 1–2 || OT || Vasilevskiy || Amalie Arena || 19,092 || 43–20–8 || 94 || 
|- align="center" bgcolor="ccffcc"
| 72 || April 10 || Buffalo Sabres || 5–0 ||  || Elliott || Amalie Arena || 19,092 || 44–20–8 || 96 || 
|- align="center" bgcolor="ffcccc"
| 73 || April 12 || @ Dallas Stars || 0–1 ||  || Vasilevskiy || American Airlines Center || 17,567 || 44–21–8 || 96 || 
|- align="center" bgcolor="ccffcc"
| 74 || April 14 || Anaheim Ducks || 4–3 || OT || Elliott || Amalie Arena || 19,092 || 45–21–8 || 98 || 
|- align="center" bgcolor="ccffcc"
| 75 || April 16 || Winnipeg Jets || 7–4 ||  || Elliott || Amalie Arena || 19,092 || 46–21–8 || 100 || 
|- align="center" bgcolor="ffcccc"
| 76 || April 19 || Detroit Red Wings || 3–4 ||  || Vasilevskiy || Amalie Arena || 19,092 || 46–22–8 || 100 || 
|- align="center" bgcolor="ccffcc"
| 77 || April 21 || Toronto Maple Leafs || 8–1 ||  || Vasilevskiy || Amalie Arena || 19,092 || 47–22–8 || 102 || 
|- align="center" bgcolor="ccffcc"
| 78 || April 23 || Nashville Predators || 6–2 ||  || Elliott || Amalie Arena || 19,092 || 48–22–8 || 104 || 
|- align="center" bgcolor="ccffcc"
| 79 || April 24 || @ Florida Panthers || 8–4 ||  || Vasilevskiy || FLA Live Arena || 17,036 || 49–22–8 || 106 || 
|- align="center" bgcolor="ccffcc"
| 80 || April 26 || Columbus Blue Jackets || 4–1 ||  || Vasilevskiy || Amalie Arena || 19,092 || 50–22–8 || 108 || 
|- align="center" bgcolor="ffcccc"
| 81 || April 28 || @ Columbus Blue Jackets || 2–5 ||  || Elliott || Nationwide Arena || 18,234 || 50–23–8 || 108 || 
|- align="center" bgcolor="ccffcc"
| 82 || April 29 || @ New York Islanders || 6–4 ||  || Vasilevskiy || UBS Arena || 17,255 || 51–23–8 || 110 || 

|-
| Lightning score listed first;

Playoffs

|- align="center" bgcolor="ffcccc"
| 1 || May 2 || @ Toronto Maple Leafs || 0–5 ||  || Vasilevskiy || Scotiabank Arena || 19,338 || 0–1 || 
|- align="center" bgcolor="ccffcc"
| 2 || May 4 || @ Toronto Maple Leafs || 5–3 ||  || Vasilevskiy || Scotiabank Arena || 19,135 || 1–1 || 
|- align="center" bgcolor="ffcccc"
| 3 || May 6 || Toronto Maple Leafs || 2–5 ||  || Vasilevskiy || Amalie Arena || 19,092 || 1–2 || 
|- align="center" bgcolor="ccffcc"
| 4 || May 8 || Toronto Maple Leafs || 7–3 ||  || Vasilevskiy || Amalie Arena || 19,092 || 2–2 || 
|- align="center" bgcolor="ffcccc"
| 5 || May 10 || @ Toronto Maple Leafs || 3–4 ||  || Vasilevskiy || Scotiabank Arena || 19,434 || 2–3 || 
|- align="center" bgcolor="ccffcc"
| 6 || May 12 || Toronto Maple Leafs || 4–3 || OT || Vasilevskiy || Amalie Arena || 19,092 || 3–3 || 
|- align="center" bgcolor="ccffcc"
| 7 || May 14 || @ Toronto Maple Leafs || 2–1 ||  || Vasilevskiy || Scotiabank Arena || 19,316 || 4–3 || 
|-

|- align="center" bgcolor="ccffcc"
| 1 || May 17 || @ Florida Panthers || 4–1 ||  || Vasilevskiy || FLA Live Arena || 19,656 || 1–0 || 
|- align="center" bgcolor="ccffcc"
| 2 || May 19 || @ Florida Panthers || 2–1 ||  || Vasilevskiy || FLA Live Arena || 19,716 || 2–0 || 
|- align="center" bgcolor="ccffcc"
| 3 || May 22 || Florida Panthers || 5–1 ||  || Vasilevskiy || Amalie Arena || 19,092 || 3–0 || 
|- align="center" bgcolor="ccffcc"
| 4 || May 23 || Florida Panthers || 2–0 ||  || Vasilevskiy || Amalie Arena || 19,092 || 4–0 ||  
|-

|- align="center" bgcolor="ffcccc"
| 1 || June 1 || @ New York Rangers || 2–6 ||  || Vasilevskiy || Madison Square Garden || 18,006 || 0–1 || 
|- align="center" bgcolor="ffcccc"
| 2 || June 3 || @ New York Rangers || 2–3 ||  || Vasilevskiy || Madison Square Garden || 18,006 || 0–2 || 
|- align="center" bgcolor="ccffcc"
| 3 || June 5 || New York Rangers || 3–2 ||  || Vasilevskiy || Amalie Arena || 19,092 || 1–2 || 
|- align="center" bgcolor="ccffcc"
| 4 || June 7 || New York Rangers || 4–1 ||  || Vasilevskiy || Amalie Arena || 19,092 || 2–2 || 
|- align="center" bgcolor="ccffcc"
| 5 || June 9 || @ New York Rangers || 3–1 ||  || Vasilevskiy || Madison Square Garden || 18,006 || 3–2 || 
|- align="center" bgcolor="ccffcc"
| 6 || June 11 || New York Rangers || 2–1 ||  || Vasilevskiy || Amalie Arena || 19,092 || 4–2 ||  
|- align=“center” bgcolor=“cccccc”

|- align="center" bgcolor="ffcccc"
| 1 || June 15 || @ Colorado Avalanche || 3–4 || OT || Vasilevskiy || Ball Arena || 17,778 || 0–1 ||  
|- align="center" bgcolor="ffcccc"
| 2 || June 18 || @ Colorado Avalanche || 0–7 ||  || Vasilevskiy || Ball Arena || 17,849 || 0–2 || 
|- align="center" bgcolor="ccffcc"
| 3 || June 20 || Colorado Avalanche || 6–2 ||  || Vasilevskiy || Amalie Arena || 19,092 || 1–2 || 
|- align="center" bgcolor="ffcccc"
| 4 || June 22 || Colorado Avalanche || 2–3 || OT || Vasilevskiy || Amalie Arena || 19,092 || 1–3 || 
|- align="center" bgcolor="ccffcc"
| 5 || June 24 || @ Colorado Avalanche || 3–2 ||  || Vasilevskiy || Ball Arena || 18,015 || 2–3 || 
|- align="center" bgcolor="ffcccc"
| 6 || June 26 || Colorado Avalanche || 1–2 ||  || Vasilevskiy || Amalie Arena || 19,092 || 2–4 ||  
|-

|-
| Lightning score listed first;

Player stats
Final

Skaters

 Most goals, assists and points in a single season by a Lightning defenseman

Goaltenders

†Denotes player spent time with another team before joining Tampa Bay.  Stats reflect time with Tampa Bay only.
‡Traded from Tampa Bay mid-season.
Bold/italics denotes franchise record

Suspensions/fines

Awards and honours

Awards

Milestones

Records

Transactions
The Lightning have been involved in the following transactions during the 2021–22 season.

Trades

Free agents

Waivers

Contract terminations

Retirement

Signings

Draft picks

Below are the Tampa Bay Lightning's selections at the 2021 NHL Entry Draft, which was held on July 23 and 24, 2021, via video conference call due to the COVID-19 pandemic.

Notes:
 The Vegas Golden Knights' fourth-round pick went to the Tampa Bay Lightning as the result of a trade on July 24, 2021, that sent a fourth-round pick in 2022 to Montreal in exchange for this pick.
 The New Jersey Devils' seventh-round pick went to the Tampa Bay Lightning as the result of a trade on November 1, 2019, that sent Louis Domingue to New Jersey in exchange for this pick (being conditional at the time of the trade).
 The Nashville Predators' seventh-round pick went to the Tampa Bay Lightning as the result of a trade on June 14, 2019, that sent Connor Ingram to Nashville in exchange for this pick.

References

Tampa Bay Lightning seasons
Tampa Bay Lightning
Tampa Bay Lightning
Tampa Bay Lightning
Eastern Conference (NHL) championship seasons
Tampa Bay